James Brinley Gibson (born May 5, 1948) is an American attorney and politician. He was the 11th mayor of Henderson, Nevada from 1997 to 2009 and is currently Clark County Commissioner since 2017. He is a member of the Democratic Party.

Biography
Gibson was born in Las Vegas, Nevada, the son of James Isaac Gibson and Audrey Brinley. He attended Brigham Young University and California Western School of Law.

Gibson was elected as mayor of Henderson in May 1997 and was re-elected for his third term in 2005. He ran for the Democratic nomination for the 2006 gubernatorial election, but lost in the primary to State Senator (now U.S. Representative) Dina Titus.

In April 2008, Gibson became an Area Seventy in the Church of Jesus Christ of Latter-day Saints.  He previously served as president of the Henderson Nevada Lake Mead Stake of the church.

Awards and honors 
Throughout his career, Gibson has received several awards and honors including the Henderson Chamber of Commerce Outstanding Member Award and the Humanitarian Award from the National Jewish Medical and Research Center. In 2007, Gibson received the Nevada State College President's Medal and the Clark County School District Crystal Apple Award. The Henderson Development Association and the City of Henderson named his as their O'Callaghan Public Sector Person of the Year in 2008 from and the Clark County Commercial Managers Group awarded him its 2009 Vision Award.

Clark County Commissioner 
Gibson was chosen by former Republican Governor of Nevada Brian Sandoval for the position of Clark County Commissioner on June 30, 2017, replacing Mary Beth Scow for the seat. He ran for a full term in 2018 and was easily elected with 55.7% of the vote against Republican nominee Cindy Lake, who got 41.9%. He was re-elected in 2022 with 53.5% of the vote.

References

External links
 Bio on Henderson, Nevada official site

1948 births
Living people
American leaders of the Church of Jesus Christ of Latter-day Saints
Area seventies (LDS Church)
Brigham Young University alumni
California Western School of Law alumni
Clark County, Nevada commissioners
Latter Day Saints from Nevada
Mayors of Henderson, Nevada
Nevada Democrats
Politicians from Las Vegas